Shelbourne F.C. have a long, illustrious history in European competitions, taking on teams such as Sporting Portugal, Barcelona, Atlético Madrid, Panathinaikos, Rangers, Rosenborg, Brøndby, Hajduk Split, Deportivo de La Coruña, Lille, and  Steaua Bucharest.

History

Early European appearances: 1962–1971
Shels first European appearance was a brief unsuccessful one, losing 5–1 away and 2–0 at home, in Dalymount Park, to Sporting Portugal, who the following season would go on to win the Cup Winners' Cup, in the 1962/63 European Cup.

In the 1963/64 Cup-Winners' Cup, Shelbourne faced Barcelona and despite battling bravely were beaten 2–0 at home and 3–1 in the Camp Nou (having taken the lead in the latter).

Then in the following season's Inter-Cities Fairs Cup, Shelbourne faced Portuguese side Belenenses. Shels gained a highly credible 1–1 draw in Lisbon, and drew 0–0 at home. As the away goals rule was not in place at the time, a toss of a coin was held to decide the venue for the replay. Shels choose right, and won the replay 2-1 giving the League of Ireland its first major scalp in Europe.  Facing Atlético Madrid in the second round who had appeared in the last two Cup Winners' Cup finals, they were narrowly beaten 1–0 in both legs.

In 1971/72, Shels played Hungarian side Vasas in the first ever competition of the UEFA Cup but lost 1–0 in Budapest and drew 1–1 at home.  Following this, Shels next European appearance would be over 20 years later.

Relatively recent past: 1992–2003 
In the European Cup of 1992/93, despite dominating the home leg, the club's first to be played at Tolka Park, Shels could only draw 0–0 with Ukrainian champions Tavriya Simferopol, and lost the away leg 2–1.  The following season Shels exacted revenge on Ukrainian football by knocking out Karpaty Lviv 3–2 on aggregate in the Cup Winners Cup.  The home leg which Shels won 3–1, saw Brian Mooney score a stunning 35 yarder on a glorious night for the Reds. Shels then lost to Panathinaikos 5–1 on aggregate in the next round.

In 1995 and 1996 Shels suffered disappointing defeats home and away to Akranes of Iceland in the UEFA Cup and Norwegian side Brann in the Cup Winners' Cup. In 1997 Shels were drawn to play Scottish side Kilmarnock. Over 600 fans made the trip for the first leg and despite taking the lead through a fantastic goal by Mark Rutherford, Shels lost 2–1 to an injury time goal.  Despite dominating the second leg in Tolka Park, it finished 1-1 and Shels were out.

In 1998 Shels came up against Rangers in the UEFA Cup. The home leg was moved to England for security reasons and despite taking a 3–0 lead, Shels ended up losing 5–3.  The return leg in Ibrox Stadium finished 2–0 to Rangers.

In 1999, Shels were played in the Intertoto Cup for the first time against Swiss side Neuchâtel Xamax.  The home leg finished 0-0 and after missing some great chances early on in the away leg, Shels lost out to two late goals.

In 2000, things started looking up for the Reds in Europe.  A late Richie Baker free kick gave Shels a 1–0 away win against Macedonian side Sloga Jugomagnat in the Champions League qualifiers.  It was a historic first ever away win in Europe for the Reds, and it was also the first away win in a European tie by a League of Ireland side for eighteen years.  In the home leg, winning 1–0 with ten minuted to go, Shels conceded a penalty which was converted.  With Sloga only needing one more to progress, Shels survived an injury time scare when defender Owen Heary somehow managed to clear the ball off his own goal line after keeper Steve Williams had been lobbed.

In the second round against Rosenborg, 10,000 fans crammed into Tolka Park for the first leg, but Shels lost 3-1 despite an excellent performance.  The away leg finished 1-1 after Rosenborg grabbed a late equaliser.  Richie Foran scored the Reds' goals in both legs.

Brøndby were Shels opponents in the UEFA Cup in 2001/02, and the Danes advanced to the next round after winning 2–0 in Brøndby Stadion and 3–0 in Tolka Park.

The following season saw Shels back in the Champions League qualifiers, but after drawing 2–2 away to Hibernians of Malta, conceded an injury time goal at home and missed out on a second round tie with Boavista.

2003 saw Shels play Slovenian side NK Olimpija of Ljubljana in the UEFA Cup, but Shels lost 1–0 away and 3–2 at home.

UEFA Champions League & UEFA Cup 2004–05
In the 2004–05 European season, they made history, becoming the first Irish club to reach the third qualifying round of the UEFA Champions League. On this run, Shels beat KR Reykjavík on away goals, followed by a 4–3 aggregate victory against Croatian champions Hajduk Split. This historic run only ended with a loss against Spanish giants, Deportivo La Coruña 3–0, having achieved a 0–0 draw in Lansdowne Road in front of 25,000 fans. That season the club also had, what was then, the longest European run in Irish history, after the Champions League exit at the hands of Deportivo the club was entered into the UEFA Cup. There Shels met French side Lille and were beaten 4–2 on aggregate, having come back from a two-goal deficit in Lansdowne Road to achieve a credible draw thanks to a brace from substitute Glen Fitzpatrick.

UEFA Champions League 2005–06

In the 2005–06 UEFA Champions League First Qualifying Round, they overcame Glentoran of Northern Ireland 6–2 on aggregate, 2–1 to Shelbourne at The Oval in Belfast and 4–1 at home in Tolka Park. Jason Byrne scored four of those goals, Glen Crowe and Owen Heary getting the others put Shebourne into the second round. They were drawn to play Romanian club Steaua Bucharest in the Second Qualifying Round of the Champions League. The first leg took place on 27 July, at home in Tolka Park, in front of a sell-out crowd and it ended in a 0–0 draw. The away leg, one week later on 3 August, saw Shelbourne defeated 4–1 in Stadionul Steaua in Bucharest, mainly due to a number of individual errors. Striker Jason Byrne was, once again, the goalscorer for Shelbourne.

Intertoto Cup 2006

2006 saw Shelbourne participate in the UEFA Intertoto Cup. They initially played Lithuanian side Vėtra in the first round, recording a 5-0 aggregate victory. On 18 June Shelbourne won 1–0 at the Vėtra Stadium in Vilnius, courtesy of a Sean Dillon headed goal just before the interval which was also the club's 50th European tie. The second leg took place in Tolka Park on 24 June, with Shelbourne romping to an easy 4–0 home victory over the Lithuanians thanks to goals from Ollie Cahill, Glen Crowe and Jason Byrne adding two more goals to his impressive European tally. Vetra's severe discipline problems resulted in the Lithuanian club ending the match with only eight players left on the field of play.

Shelbourne played Odense of Denmark in the Second Round, but suffered a 3–0 away defeat in TRE-FOR Park, Odense on 2 July. Shels won the second leg at Tolka Park 1-0 thanks to a goal from Cameroon international Joseph Ndo, losing the tie 3–1 on aggregate. This was to be Shelbourne's last European game before their demotion to the League of Ireland First Division. The 1–0 victory in Tolka Park meant Shelbourne became unbeaten in their last eight home European matches.

UEFA Champions League 2007–08
Despite winning the League of Ireland championship in November 2006, Shelbourne announced on 29 March 2007 that they would not be applying for a UEFA licence to compete in the 2007–08 Champions League first qualifying round. The club was demoted to the First Division by the FAI before the start of the 2007 season due to ongoing financial problems and it was unlikely they would have secured the necessary licence to take part in the competition.

European record

Overview

Matches

Statistics
Biggest European Win:
single tie: 4-0 vs Vėtra home, 24 June 2006
aggregate: 5-0 vs Vėtra, June 2006
Top European scorer:
season: 5, Jason Byrne, (2004/05)
total: 8, Jason Byrne, (2003–06)
Shelbourne have beaten the following sides:
 Belenenses – Inter-Cities Fairs Cup
 Karpaty Lviv – UEFA Cup Winners Cup
 Sloga Jugomagnat – UEFA Champions League
 KR Reykjavik – UEFA Champions League
 Hajduk Split – UEFA Champions League
 Glentoran – UEFA Champions League
 Vėtra – UEFA Intertoto Cup
Shelbourne are unbeaten in their last 8 home games in European competition, a record for an Irish club. The teams played in this run are:
 KR Reykjavik, 0-0
 Hajduk Split, 2-0
 Deportivo La Coruña, 0-0
 Lille, 2-2
 Glentoran, 4-1
 Steaua Bucharest, 0-0
 Vėtra, 4-0
 Odense, 1-0
Shelbourne have won a total of 9 ties in all European competition.
 Belenenses – Inter-Cities Fairs Cup 1st Round 1963/1964- H 2-1
  Karpaty Lviv – Cup Winners' Cup Prelim Round 1993/1994- H 3-1
FK Sloga Jugomagnat – Champions League 1st Qualifying Round 2000/2001 A 0-1
 Hajduk Split – Champions League 2nd Qualifying Round 2004/2005 – H 2-0
 Glentoran – Champions League 1st Qualifying Round 2005/2006 – A 2-1 – H 4-1
 Vėtra – Intertoto Cup 1st round 2006 – A 1-0 – H 4-0
 Odense – Intertoto Cup 2nd Round 2006 – H 1-0
Shelbourne's 4–0 home win over Vėtra in June 2006 equalled the highest win by a League of Ireland side in a single European tie.
Shelbourne were the first Irish club to reach the 3rd qualifying round of the Champions League and were the only team to reach the 3rd qualifying round until the qualifying rounds were restructured for the 2009–10 Champions League qualifying phase.
In the 2000/2001 season Shelbourne remained unbeaten away from home in both their European away fixtures. They beat a much fancied FK Sloga Jugomagnat 1–0 in Macedonia and got a very good 1–1 draw against a very strong Rosenborg in Norway.

UEFA ranking
Shelbourne were ranked in the top 250 until 2006; however, since this time they have not been ranked. Their last ranking was from 1 October 2006.

Current club ranking
 213  MyPa-47
 214  Zimbru Chisinau
 =215  Derry City F.C.
 =215  Shelbourne F.C.
 217  Vardar Skopje
 Full List

Current national league UEFA ranking
Correct as of 2019
 36 
 37  Ireland
 38 

Full list

References

External links
European Matches Results
Official site:
ShelsWeb
Independent Supporters Group:
RedsIndependent.com
The Real Reds & Shels TV

Europe
Shelbourne